Dhuwakot is a village development committee in Gorkha District in the Gandaki Zone of northern-central Nepal. At the time of the 2011 Nepal census it had a population of 4,259 and had 1,110 houses in the town.

References

Populated places in Gorkha District